Elias Khoury Slaiman Slaiman (born 16 August 1951 in Hekr Semaan, Syria) is a Syrian emeritus bishop of the Maronite Catholic Eparchy of Latakia.

Life

Elias Khoury Slaiman received on 29 August 1987 his priestly ordination. Pope John Paul II appointed him on 16 January 2012 bishop of Latakia.

His episcopal ordination was performed by the hands of the Maronite Patriarch of Antioch, Bechara Boutros al-Rahi, OMM, on 25 February 2012; his co-consecrators were Youssef Anis Abi-Aad, IdP, Archeparch of Aleppo, and Antoine Nabil Andari, Curial Bishop in Antioch. Slaiman was introduced in the office on 26 February of the same year.

On 14 March 2015 Elias Slaiman resigned his office as Maronite Eparch of Latakia.

References

External links

 http://www.catholic-hierarchy.org/bishop/bslaim.html

1951 births
21st-century Maronite Catholic bishops
Syrian people
Living people